Daria Sergeyevna Trubnikova (born 1 January 2003) is a retired Russian individual rhythmic gymnast. She is the 2018 European Junior Clubs and Team champion. On national level she is a 2018 Russian Junior all-around bronze medalist. She is the 2018 Youth Olympic Games individual all-around champion, the 2019 Grand Prix Final all-around gold medallist and the 2021 World Cup Baku all-around gold medallist. In January 2023, Daria announced her retirement from sports.

Career

Junior 
Daria Trubnikova was born in Tambov on January 1, 2003. She began training in rhythmic gymnastics at 6. Trubnikova competed at the 2018 Rhythmic Gymnastics European Championships winning gold in the clubs and team events.
At the 2018 Summer Youth Olympics Daria won the rhythmic gymnastics all-around title ahead of Ukrainian gymnast Khrystyna Pohranychna and Italian gymnast Talisa Torretti. This win secured Russia's third consecutive Youth Olympic Games gold medal in rhythmic gymnastics.

Senior 
At the 2019 Moscow Grand Prix, Trubnikova won the gold all-round medal ahead of Arina Averina, also of Russia. At the 2019 Brno Grand Prix Final, Trubnikova was the gold medallist in the all-around, ahead of Arina Averina and Katrin Taseva. Trubnikova also competed at the 2020 Moscow Grand Prix where she won the silver all-around medal behind fellow compatriot Dina Averina and ahead of Lala Kramarenko, where she won gold in the clubs final.

In 2021, she was selected for the Russian national team after placing in the top 8 at the national championships. Won the gold medal ahead of Boryana Kaleyn and Lala Kramarenko in the all-around at the World Cup Baku.
 At the same event, she won the silver medal in ball. In the 2021 Minsk World Challenge Cup, she finished in 5th place in the all-around, behind Nicol Zelikman from Israel. Later that year, Irina Viner announced that Trubnikova, Lala Kramarenko and Ekaterina Selezneva, would be the Olympic reserves of Dina and Arina Averina at the Olympic Games in Tokyo 2021. Trubnikova also competed in the Brno Grand Prix, where she took silver in the all-around ahead of Irina Annenkova and behind of Lala Kramarenko. She also the gold in hoop and another silver medal in ribbon. In October she competed in the Cluj Napoca World Cup Challenge, where she won the full bronze behind Boryana Kaleyn and Milena Baldassarri. In the finals by apparatus he obtained bronze in hoop and clubs, silver in ball and 4th place in ribbon

Routine music information

References

External links

 

2003 births
Living people
Russian rhythmic gymnasts
Gymnasts at the 2018 Summer Youth Olympics
Youth Olympic gold medalists for Russia
Sportspeople from Tambov